Agronômica (Agronomic) is a Brazilian municipality in the state of Santa Catarina.

References

Municipalities in Santa Catarina (state)